Dr. Kunio Yamazaki was a biologist who worked at the Monell Chemical Senses Center from 1980 until his death. Yamazaki is most notable for his extensive work with the major histocompatibility complex. 

He has worked with Dr. Gary Beauchamp, also of Monell, before.

References

Japanese biologists
2013 deaths
Year of birth missing
University of Tokyo alumni
Japanese expatriates in the United States